Kella may refer to:

People
 Kaisa Kella, Finnish figure skater
 Marjaana Kella (born 1961), Finnish photographer

Places
 Kella, Thuringia, Germany
 Kella, Florina, Greece